Julie R. Fernandez-Fernandez (born 20 March 1972) is a Belgian politician for the Socialist Party who was a member of the Chamber of Representatives from 2010 to 2019.

She served as Secretary of State for Disabled Persons (Social Affairs and Public Health) in the Leterme I Government.

References

External links 
 Twitter
 Facebook

1972 births
Living people
21st-century Belgian women politicians
21st-century Belgian politicians
Socialist Party (Belgium) politicians
Members of the Chamber of Representatives (Belgium)
Belgian people of Spanish descent
Members of the Parliament of the French Community

Government ministers of Belgium
Women government ministers of Belgium